The Thirteenth Dream was the second (and final) "reunion" album from Spirit, and their eleventh album overall. It features re-recordings of seven of their best-loved tracks, along with three new songs. The most noteworthy things that can be said about the album are in regard to the excellent fidelity of the album, as it was originally recorded by an audiophile label and is an early digital recording (dating from December 1982), and that it was the first Spirit album to be released on CD, as it appeared in that format from Mercury Records in West Germany in 1984 (consequently, it is also one of the best sounding early CD releases from a rock band, probably due to the recording technology that was implemented).

As previously mentioned, this album was originally released on CD in 1984. However, the original CD is incredibly rare. It was later reissued in 2004 by Beat Goes On in a two-fer with Future Games.

A version of "Elijah" (originally released on Spirit) was recorded during these sessions and issued as the B-side of a maxi single. It has not appeared on any of the CD releases, nor on the LP.

The album was issued as Spirit of '84 by Mercury in the United States, with a different cover photo.

Track listing 
All songs written by Jay Ferguson except noted.

Personnel

Spirit 
Randy California - guitar, vocals
Mark Andes - bass, vocals
Ed Cassidy - percussion, drums
Jay Ferguson - guitar, vocals
John Locke - keyboards

Additional musicians 
Jeff "Skunk" Baxter - guitar
Bob Welch - guitar, vocals 
Joe Lala - percussion
Matt Andes - guitar, vocals
Howard Leese - guitar
Gary Myrick - guitar
Neal Doughty - keyboards
Jerry Jumonville - saxophone
Curly Smith - percussion, drums, vocals
Keith Knudsen - percussion, drums
Bruce Gary - percussion, vocals
Alan Gratzer - percussion, vocals
Bobby LaKind - percussion

Production 
David DeVore - producer
Gary W. Gratzer - executive producer
Thomas L. Chavey - executive producer
Michael Verdick - mixing
Mike Nocito - mixing
Allen Sides - engineer
Stan Katayama - assistant engineer
Mark Richardson - assistant engineer
Mark Ettel - assistant engineer
Art Ache - art direction, illustrations
Patti Heid - art direction, illustrations

References 

Spirit (band) albums
1984 albums
Mercury Records albums
Legacy Recordings albums